The 1985–86 NCAA Division I men's preseason basketball rankings was made up of two human polls, the AP Poll and the Coaches Poll, in addition to various other preseason polls. The Louisville Cardinals would finish the season ranked at the top of both polls after winning the National Championship.

Legend

AP Poll

Coaches Poll

References 

1985-86 NCAA Division I men's basketball rankings
College men's basketball rankings in the United States